The Boston Theater District is the center of Boston's theater scene.  Many of its theaters are on Washington Street, Tremont Street, Boylston Street, and Huntington Avenue.

History
Plays were banned in Boston by the Puritans until 1792.  Boston's first theater opened in 1793.  In 1900, the Boston Theater District had 31 theaters, with 50,000 seats.  In the 1940s, the city had over 50 theaters.  Since the 1970s, developers have renovated old theaters.

Revitalization
Suffolk University bought the Modern Theater in 2008.  It has since reopened and hosts a variety of performances.  For their efforts, Suffolk won a Preservation Honor Award from the National Trust for Historic Preservation in 2011.

Emerson College now  uses the Paramount Theater as a "mixed-use residential, academic, and performance venue."

Washington Street Theatre District
The Washington Street Theatre District, consisting of seven buildings on the west side of Washington Street (numbers 511-559), was listed on the National Register of Historic Places in 1979.  Buildings in the district include the Boston Opera House, built on the site of the city's second theater.  Its entrance hall is the city's only surviving work of noted theater designer Thomas W. Lamb.  Also in the district are the 1932 Paramount Theatre and the Modern Theatre.  These theaters and their predecessors have displayed the gamut of theatrical entertainment across more than two centuries, including vaudeville, comedy, and film.

Theaters 
Boch Center:
Shubert Theatre
Wang Theater
Boston Opera House
Charles Playhouse
Cutler Majestic Theatre
Colonial Theatre
The Lyric Stage Company of Boston
Modern Theatre
Orpheum Theatre
Paramount Theatre
Wilbur Theatre
Huntington Theatre Company

See also
List of former theatres in Boston
Boston Theater Critics Association
Boston Theater Marathon
Buffalo Theater District
Cleveland Theater District
Houston Theater District
Broadway Theater District (Los Angeles)
Theater District, Manhattan

References

External links
Where's the Theater District: An Analysis of Boston's Theater District, by	Kristin Hodgkins (1980)
Boston Athaneum Theater History

 
Neighborhoods in Boston
Historic districts on the National Register of Historic Places in Massachusetts
National Register of Historic Places in Boston
Boston